The title Baron Renton can refer to:

A senator of the College of Justice:

John Home, Lord Renton (1600–1671)

Members of the House of Lords:

David Renton, Baron Renton (1908–2007; created a life peer in 1979).
Tim Renton, Baron Renton of Mount Harry (1932–2020; created a life peer in 1997).

As David Renton was created a peer some years before Timothy Renton, the title Baron Renton, without qualification, is more likely to refer to David Renton. The two are not related.

Noble titles created in 1979
Noble titles created for UK MPs